Lt Col. Charles Harbord, 6th Baron Suffield, CB, MVO (14 June 1855 – 10 February 1924), was a British Army officer and British Conservative politician.

Suffield was the eldest son of Charles Harbord, 5th Baron Suffield, and his first wife Cecilia Annetta, daughter of Henry Baring, third son of Sir Francis Baring, 1st Baronet. He schooled at Eton and entered the Scots Fusilier Guards as an ensign on 30 April 1873 and was promoted lieutenant in April 1875.

Harbord was appointed second in command of the 2nd Scots Guards in December 1899 and then served in the Second Boer War, arriving with his regiment in May 1900. He took command of the 1st Scots Guards in July 1901 and was to bring them home at the war's end, leaving Cape Town on the SS Winifredian in September 1902. For his service he was mentioned in despatches in 1901 and appointed a Companion of the Order of the Bath (CB) in the September 1901 South Africa Honours list (the award was dated to 29 November 1900). After his return home he was on 22 October 1902 received at Buckingham Palace by King Edward VII who created him a Member (4th class) of the Royal Victorian Order (MVO), and on 24 October 1902 returned there to be invested with the CB. He retired from the army in 1904.

He served as a Groom-in-Waiting to Queen Victoria from 1895 to 1901. In 1914 Suffield succeeded his father in the barony and took his seat on the Conservative benches in the House of Lords. The following year he was appointed Captain of the Yeomen of the Guard (Deputy Chief Whip in the House of Lords) in the coalition government of H. H. Asquith, a post he held until 1918, the last two years under the premiership of David Lloyd George.

Lord Suffield married in 1896 Evelyn Louisa Wilson-Patten, daughter of Captain Eustace John Wilson-Patten (eldest son of John Wilson-Patten, 1st Baron Winmarleigh). He died in February 1924, aged 68, and was succeeded by his eldest son Victor. Lady Suffield died in 1951.

Arms

References
Kidd, Charles, Williamson, David (editors). Debrett's Peerage and Baronetage (1990 edition). New York: St Martin's Press, 1990, 

Military profile at www.angloboerwar.com

1855 births
1924 deaths
People educated at Eton College
Companions of the Order of the Bath
Members of the Royal Victorian Order
Scots Guards officers
British Army personnel of the Second Boer War
Charles 06